Luis Ramírez de Lucena (c. 1465 – c. 1530) was a Spanish chess player who published the first extant chess book. He is believed to be the son of humanist writer and diplomat Juan de Lucena.

Book

Lucena wrote the oldest surviving printed book on chess, Repetición de Amores y Arte de Ajedrez con CL [150] Juegos de Partido ("Repetition of Love and the Art of Playing Chess with 150 Games"), published in Salamanca around 1497. The book includes analysis of eleven chess openings but also contains many elementary errors that led chess historian H. J. R. Murray to suggest that it was prepared in a hurry. The book was written when the rules of chess were taking their modern form (see origins of modern chess), and some of the 150 positions in the book are of the old game and some of the new. Fewer than a dozen copies of the book exist.

Commentators have suggested that much of the material was copied from Francesc Vicent's now-lost 1495 work Libre dels jochs partits dels schacs en nombre de 100.

The Lucena position is named after him, even though it does not appear in his book. (It was first published in 1634 by Alessandro Salvio.) The smothered mate (later named Philidor's legacy) is in the book.

References

Sources

External links

 Lucena's book online
 Berliner Schach-Erinnerungen nebst den Spielen des Greco und Lucena by Baron von der Lasa, Leipzig 1859 - includes German translation and commentary on Lucena's work

Converts to Roman Catholicism from Judaism
Spanish people of Jewish descent
Spanish chess players
Spanish chess writers
Spanish Roman Catholics
1460s births
1530s deaths
15th century in chess
University of Salamanca alumni
People from Lucena, Córdoba